The Kilutea River is a glacier-fed watercourse on Baffin Island's Borden Peninsula, approximately  long. It flows east and empties into Navy Board Inlet.

References

Bodies of water of Baffin Island
Rivers of Qikiqtaaluk Region